The 1999 Asian Judo Championships were held in Wenzhou, China 25 June to 26 June 1999.

Medal overview

Men's events

Women's events

Medals table

References

External links
 
 Judo Union of Asia

Asian Championships
Judo Championships
Asian Judo Championships
Asian Judo Championships
Judo
Wenzhou
Judo competitions in China